Eugene Arnoľdovič Helimski (sometimes also spelled Eugene Khelimski, Russian: Евге́ний Арно́льдович Хели́мский; 15 March 1950 in Odessa, USSR – 25 December 2007 in Hamburg, Germany) was a Soviet and Russian linguist (in the latter part of his life working in Germany). He was a Doctor of Philosophy (1988) and Professor.

Helimski researched Samoyedic and Finno-Ugric languages, problems of Uralic and Nostratic linguistic affinity, language contact, the theory of genetic classification of languages, and the cultural history of Northern Eurasia and of shamanism.  He became one of the world's leading specialists in Samoyedic languages.

Biography 
Helimski graduated from the Department of Structural and Applied Linguistics of Moscow State University (1972); completed a Dissertation on "Ancient Ugro-Samoyedic Linguistic Ties" (Tartu, 1979); completed the Doctoral Dissertation on "Historical and Descriptive Dialectology of the Samoyedic Languages" (Tartu, 1988); worked at the Institute of Slavic and Balkan Studies at the Russian Academy of Sciences (1978—1997); lectured at the RSUH (1992—1998), University of Budapest (1994—1995) and other European universities.  From 1998 onward, he was Professor of Hamburg University and Director of the Institute of Finno-Ugrian and Uralic Studies in Hamburg.

Scientific contributions 
Helimski was a participant and organizer of numerous linguistic expeditions to Siberia and to the Taimyr Peninsula; field studies of all Samoyedic languages, one of the authors of the well-known Studies on the Selkup Language, which was based on field studies and has substantially broadened the linguistic understanding of Samoyedic.  He exposed a number of regularities in the historical phonetics of Hungarian, and substantiated the existence of grammatical and lexical Ugro-Samoyedic parallels.  He gathered all accessible data on Mator, the extinct South-Samoyedic language, and published its dictionary and grammar.  He proposed a number of novel Uralic, Indo-European and Nostratic etymologies, and collected a large body of material on the borrowed lexicon of the languages of Siberia (including Russian).

Helimski proposed a number of modifications to the traditional theory of the "genealogical tree" with respect to the Uralic data, which affected comparative studies in general.

He worked on problematics of shamanism among the Samoyedic peoples, collected and published texts of shamanistic incantations.

He published several editions of "Таймырский этнолингвистический сборник" ("Taimyr Ethno-Linguistic Compendium", RSUH) and other works on Uralistics.

Helimski  initiated the development of a digital database of Uralic, which later became part of Sergei Starostin's StarLing Project.
(The database is based largely on Károly Rédei's Uralic Etymological Dictionary, UEW.)

Main publications 
 Очерки по селькупскому языку: Тазовский диалект. Ч. 1-3. М., 1980, 1993, 2002 (Co-authored with: А. И. Кузнецова et al.).
 Древнейшие венгерско-самодийские языковые параллели: Лингвистическая и этногенетическая интерпретация. М., 1982.
 The Language of the First Selkup Books. Szeged, 1983 — (Studia Uralo-Altaica 22).
 Die Matorische Sprache: Wörterbuch — Grundzüge der Grammatik — Sprachgeschichte unter Mitarbeit von Beáta Nagy. Szeged, 1997. — (Studia Uralo-Altaica 41).
 Компаративистика, уралистика: Лекции и статьи. М., 2000.
 Самодийско-тунгусо-маньчжурские лексические связи. М.: Языки славянской культуры, 2007 (co-author: А. Е. Аникин).

Notes

References 
 A comprehensive bibliography appears in the article (in Czech) about Helimski (referred to as Evgenij Chelimskij) by Václav Blažek, of the University of Brno.  This bibliography is particularly useful since the author's personal web sites are no longer functional (see below).  The article is available from the repository of materials about renowned Indo-Europeanists and philologists, University of Frankfurt.
 Home page To move to University of Hamburg servers, as of June 2011.
 New Home page at Hamburg University
 (Original) Home page at Hamburg University (link defunct)
 List of publications at Hamburg University
 Obituary in grani.ru
 Obituary in NovayaGazeta

Further reading 
Vol. 14 (2009) of Studia Etymologica Cracoviensia is dedicated to the memory of E. A. Helimski. It contains i.a. three biographical studies.

1950 births
2007 deaths
Writers from Odesa
Linguists from the Soviet Union
20th-century linguists
Linguists from Russia
Linguists from Ukraine
Historical linguists
Russian Finno-Ugrists
Paleolinguists
Moscow State University alumni
Linguists of Samoyedic languages
Academic staff of the University of Hamburg
Ukrainian emigrants to Germany